Helmut Schubert (17 February 1916 – 24 July 1988) was a German international footballer who played for Dresdner SC and BSG Motor Zwickau.

References

External links

1916 births
1988 deaths
Association football midfielders
German footballers
Germany international footballers
FSV Zwickau players
Dresdner SC players
DDR-Oberliga players